Leaton is a small village in Shropshire, England.

It is situated on the B5067, Shrewsbury to Baschurch road, in the parish of Pimhill.

The village has an impressive church, the Holy Trinity. This was built in 1859, with the tower added in 1872, by Shrewsbury architect Samuel Pountney Smith. The churchyard contains the war graves of a King's Shropshire Light Infantry soldier of World War I and a RAF officer of World War II.

The Shrewsbury to Chester Line runs through, though the nearest railway station is at Shrewsbury, as the former Leaton railway station closed to passengers in 1960. The signal box went in 1988, but today there remains a level crossing. A small industrial estate now exists at the former railway sidings.

There once existed the Leaton Brick and Pipe Works, one of a number of clay-based industries in the area.

North of the village on the main road junction with the road to Montford Bridge is a war memorial cross on a nonagonal plinth listing local men who died serving in the First World War and those who served and returned from the war.

Just to the south of Leaton is the hamlet of Dunnsheath.

See also
Listed buildings in Pimhill

References

External links

Villages in Shropshire